The Berthold Leibinger Zukunftspreis (engl.: future prize) is an international award for excellent research on the application or generation of laser light. Since 2006 it is biennially awarded by the German non-profit foundation Berthold Leibinger Stiftung with an amount of 50,000 euros, not earmarked.

Recipients 
 2018: Karl Deisseroth, Stanford University, “Laser in the Development and Implementation of Optogenetics”
 2016: Gérard Mourou, IZEST, International Zettawatt Exawatt Science and Technology, École Polytechnique, France, “Invention of the Chirped Pulse Amplification (CPA) and Pushing the Frontier on Extreme Light”
 2014: Philip Russell, Max Planck Institute for the Science of Light, “Photonic Crystal Fibre”
 2012: Osamu Kumagai, Sony Corp., “Multi-Wavelength Laser Diode for Backward Compatibility of Three Generations’ Optical Disc Systems”
 2010: Federico Capasso, Harvard University, “Quantum Cascade Lasers”
 2008: Xiaoliang Sunney Xie, Harvard University, “Single-Molecule Biophysics and Non-Linear Optical Microscopy“
 2006: H. Jeffrey Kimble, California Institute of Technology, “Cavity quantum electrodynamics“

See also 
 Berthold Leibinger Innovationspreis (affiliated innovation prize)
 Berthold Leibinger (founder of issuing foundation)
 List of physics awards

References

External links 
 Website of the Berthold Leibinger Stiftung

Science and technology awards
Awards established in 2006
Laser awards and associations